William Easton (January 25, 1875 – August 29, 1928) was an American tennis player. He competed in the men's singles event at the 1904 Summer Olympics.

References

1875 births
1928 deaths
American male tennis players
Olympic tennis players of the United States
Tennis players at the 1904 Summer Olympics
Place of birth missing